Filip Modelski (born 28 September 1992) is a Polish professional footballer who plays as a full-back.

Career

Club
Modelski spent three seasons at English club West Ham United between 2008 and 2011. He played youth football with the club, but did not make a senior appearance. In August 2011, Modelski joined GKS Bełchatów on a one-year contract.

References

External links
 
 

1992 births
Living people
Sportspeople from Gdynia
Polish footballers
Polish expatriate footballers
Poland youth international footballers
Poland international footballers
Association football fullbacks
West Ham United F.C. players
GKS Bełchatów players
Jagiellonia Białystok players
Bytovia Bytów players
Podbeskidzie Bielsko-Biała players
Bruk-Bet Termalica Nieciecza players
Kotwica Kołobrzeg footballers
Ekstraklasa players
I liga players
II liga players
III liga players
Polish expatriate sportspeople in England
Expatriate footballers in England